Muslim Sattarov (born 12 November 1965) is an Uzbekistani former competitive ice dancer. With his skating partner, Dinara Nurdbayeva, he represented Uzbekistan at the 1994 Winter Olympics in Lillehammer, placing 21st in the ice dance category.

Competitive highlights 
 with Nurdbayeva

References 

1965 births
Figure skaters at the 1994 Winter Olympics
Living people
Olympic figure skaters of Uzbekistan
Sportspeople from Tashkent
Uzbekistani male ice dancers
Dancers from Tashkent